My Favorite Picture of You is the fourteenth and final studio album by American singer-songwriter Guy Clark before his death in May 2016. The album was released in July 2013 under Dualtone Records, and won the 2014 Grammy Award for Best Folk Album.

Track list

Personnel
Shawn Camp - banjo, fiddle, acoustic guitar, resonator guitar, mandolin, octave fiddle, background vocals
Guy Clark - acoustic guitar, lead vocals
Bryn Davies - bass guitar, cello, background vocals
Chris Latham - acoustic guitar, resonator guitar, viola, violin, background vocals
Noel McKay - nylon string guitar
Gordie Sampson - acoustic guitar
Morgane Stapleton - background vocals
Verlon Thompson - acoustic guitar, background vocals

Chart performance

References

Further reading

 

2013 albums
Dualtone Records albums
Guy Clark albums